This is a list of American television-related events in 1954.

Events

Television programs

Debuts

Changes of network affiliation

Ending this year

Television films and specials
December 25 - The Walt Disney Christmas Show on CBS

Television stations

Station launches

Network affiliation changes

Station closures

Births

Deaths

References

External links 
List of 1954 American television series at IMDb

Sources